Under Satanæ is a studio album by Portuguese gothic metal band Moonspell. It contains re-recorded songs of their early material, some of it from their 1994 work Under the Moonspell, and the rest from their demo tapes Anno Satanæ (hence Under + Satanæ) and Serpent Angel from their debut demo (under name Morbid God).

Track listing 
"Halla alle halla al rabka halla (Praeludium/Incantatum Solistitium)" – 2:18
"Tenebrarum Oratorium (Andamento I/Erudit Compendyum)" – 6:23
"Interludium/Incantatum Oequinoctum" – 1:33
"Tenebrarum Oratorium (Andamento II/Erotic Compendyum)" – 6:15
"Opus Diabolicum (Andamento III/Instrumental Compendyum)" – 5:08
"Chorai Lusitânia! (Epilogus/Incantatam Maresia)" – 1:50
"Goat on Fire" – 6:34
"Ancient Winter Goddess" – 6:08
"Wolves from the Fog" – 7:03
"Serpent Angel" – 7:13

Personnel 
Fernando Ribeiro (Langsuyar) – vocals
Ricardo Amorim (Morning Blade) – guitars
Pedro Paixão (Passionis/Neophytus) – keyboards
Miguel Gaspar (Mike/Nisroth) – drums

Additional personnel
Aires Pereira (Ahriman) – bass
João Pereira (Tanngrisnir) – acoustic guitar (track 6, not re-recorded original from Under the Moonspell)
Christophe Szpajdel – logo

Charts

References

External links 
 Moonspell band website

2007 albums
Moonspell albums
SPV/Steamhammer albums
Albums produced by Tue Madsen